Yaddo is an artists' community located on a  estate in Saratoga Springs, New York.  Its mission is "to nurture the creative process by providing an opportunity for artists to work without interruption in a supportive environment." On March 11, 2013 it was designated a National Historic Landmark.

It offers residencies to artists working in choreography, film, literature, musical composition, painting, performance art, photography, printmaking, sculpture, and video. Collectively, artists who have worked at Yaddo have won 66 Pulitzer Prizes, 27 MacArthur Fellowships, 61 National Book Awards, 24 National Book Critics Circle Awards, 108 Rome Prizes, 49 Whiting Writers' Awards, a Nobel Prize (Saul Bellow, who won the Pulitzer Prize in Fiction and Nobel Prize in Literature in 1976), at least one Man Booker Prize (Alan Hollinghurst, 2004) and countless other honors. Yaddo is included in the Union Avenue Historic District.

History
The estate was purchased in 1881 by the financier Spencer Trask and his wife, the writer Katrina Trask. The first mansion on the property burned down in 1893, and the Trasks then built the current house.  Yaddo is a neologism invented by one of the Trask children and was meant to rhyme with "shadow".

Artists' colony

In 1900, after the premature deaths of the Trasks' four children, Spencer Trask decided to turn the estate into an artists' retreat as a gift to his wife.  He did this with the financial assistance of philanthropist George Foster Peabody.  The first artists arrived in 1926. The success of Yaddo encouraged Spencer and Katrina later to donate land for a working women's retreat center as well, known as Wiawaka Holiday House, at the request of Mary Wiltsie Fuller. At least in its early years, Yaddo was funded by profits from the Bowling Green Offices Building in Manhattan, in which Spencer Trask was extensively involved.

In 1949 during the McCarthy Era, a news story accurately accused writer Agnes Smedley of spying for the Soviet Union. Smedley had traveled with Mao Zedong to report on the Chinese Communist Revolution and, beginning in 1943, had spent five years at Yaddo. Poet Robert Lowell pushed the Board of Directors to oust Yaddo's director, Elizabeth Ames, who was being questioned by the FBI.  Ames was eventually exonerated of all charges but learned from the investigation that her assistant Mary Townsend was an FBI informant. Ames remained director until her retirement in 1969, having overseen the Yaddo community from its creation in 1924. Ames was succeeded by Newman E. Waite who served as president from 1969 until 1977 when Curtis Harnack assumed the position.

Literary critic and eventual Yaddo board member Louis Kronenberger wrote in his memoir that to call Yaddo "a mixture of some of the most attractive, enjoyable, generous-minded people and of others who were weird, megalomaniac, intransigent, pugnacious is only to say that it has housed and nourished most of the finest talents in the arts of the past forty-odd years—the immensely fruitful years of Elizabeth Ames's directorship."

Recent years 
In May 2005, vandals, using paintball guns, damaged two of the Four Seasons statues, the Poet's Bench, a fountain, and pathways with blue paint. Repairs cost $1,400. In 2018, Yaddo elected photographer Peter Kayafas and novelist Janice Y.K. Lee as co-chairs of its board of directors.

Yaddo has received large contributions from Spencer Trask & Company and Kevin Kimberlin, the firm's current chairman. Novelist Patricia Highsmith bequeathed her estate, valued at $3 million, to the community.

Facilities and gardens 

Yaddo's gardens are modeled after the classical Italian gardens the Trasks had visited in Europe. The Four Seasons statues were acquired and installed in the garden in 1909. There are many statues and sculptures located within the estate, including a sundial that bears the inscription, "Hours fly, Flowers die, New days, New ways, Pass by, Love stays." While visitors are not admitted to the main mansion or artists' residences, they may visit the gardens.

Alumni artists-in-residence
Yaddo has hosted more than 6,000 artists including:

 Hannah Arendt
 Michael Ashkin
 Newton Arvin
 Milton Avery
 James Baldwin
 Louise Belcourt
 Saul Bellow
 Leonard Bernstein
 Elizabeth Bishop
 Sharon Butler
 Truman Capote
 Henri Cartier-Bresson
 Jordan Casteel
 Rebecca Chace
 John Cheever
 Aaron Copland
 Roger Crossgrove
 Beauford Delaney
 Arthur Deshaies
 Blane De St. Croix
 Sari Dienes
 John Dilg
 Torkwase Dyson
 Mary Beth Edelson
 Jonathan Elliott
 Kenneth Fearing
 Jonathan Franzen
 Daniel Fuchs
 William Gass
 Steve Giovinco
 Philip Guston
 Daron Hagen
 Michael Harrison 
 Ruth Heller
 Patricia Highsmith
 Chester Himes
 Marilyn Gayle Hoff
 Langston Hughes
 Ted Hughes
 Alfred Kazin
 Jeanne Jaffe
 Ulysses Kay
 Wlodzimierz Ksiazek
 Louis Kronenberger
 Stanley Kunitz
 Jacob Lawrence
 Alan Lelchuk
 Robert Lowell
 Grace Lumpkin
 Alison Lurie
 Carmen Maria Machado
 Carson McCullers
 Melissa Meyer
 Robert Nozick
 Flannery O'Connor
 Dorothy Parker
 William Ordway Partridge
 Sylvia Plath
 Katherine Anne Porter
 Mario Puzo
 Carl Rakosi
 Tom Raworth
 Esther Rolick
 Ned Rorem
 Henry Roth
 Philip Roth
 Carl Schmitt
 Delmore Schwartz
 Ann Loomis Silsbee
 Elizabeth Sparhawk-Jones
 Clyfford Still
 Stephanie Strickland
 Virgil Thomson
 Colm Tóibín
 Lionel Trilling
 Anne Truitt
 Byron Vazakas
 David Foster Wallace
 Eudora Welty

In popular culture
Jonathan Ames' book Wake Up Sir! (2004) is partially set at Yaddo.

Dagger of the Mind (1941), a novel by 1930s Yaddo resident Kenneth Fearing, takes place in Demarest Hall, an art colony modeled after Yaddo.

In You season 1, episode 8: "You Got Me Babe", Blythe helps Beck focus on writing and break through writer's block by disconnecting Beck from her cellphone and the Internet, and setting up Beck's apartment to make her "own Yaddo".

Yaddo is mentioned repeatedly throughout the Theresa Rebeck play Seminar.

In the 2018 Netflix comedy-drama Private Life, aspiring writer Sadie (played by Kayli Carter) gets the opportunity to spend a month at Yaddo to focus on refining her writing skills. It is also repeatedly mentioned and referenced throughout the movie, e.g. by a coffee mug showing the Yaddo name on it. A few scenes of the movie are set at Yaddo‘s location as well.

Mentioned in the Showtime series The Affair season 2, episode 11 where Noah Solloway's agent offers to set him up at Yaddo to write his second novel.

See also
List of National Historic Landmarks in New York
National Register of Historic Places listings in Saratoga County, New York

Notes

References

Further reading

External links 

 

American art
Artist residencies
1926 establishments in New York (state)
Saratoga Springs, New York
Artist colonies
Tourist attractions in Saratoga Springs, New York
National Historic Landmarks in New York (state)
National Register of Historic Places in Saratoga County, New York